The Tianjin International School (TIS) is a private, international school in Hexi District of Tianjin, China. Students attend from the age of three through to high school graduation. Founded in 1986, it was the first of six schools in iSC (International Schools Consortium) established in six Chinese cities: Qingdao, Shenyang, Chengdu, Wuxi, Wuhan, and Yantai.

Students from around the world attend, including Australia, Canada, France, Hong Kong, Japan, Singapore, South Africa, South Korea, Australia, United Kingdom, India and the United States. The school is accredited by ASC-WASC (Accrediting Commission for Schools (ACS) of the Western Association of Schools and Colleges) and is affiliated with organizations such as EARCOS (East Asia Regional Council of Schools), and AmCham (American Chamber of Commerce).

TIS offers an honors program, as well as providing opportunities to take the PSAT, SAT, ACT, and AP exams. In 2019, TIS was approved for the AP Capstone Diploma Program.

TIS employs 81 faculty members from many countries including the United States, Canada, Australia, Europe, and Asia.

Tianjin International School's address is No. 4-1 Sishui Road, Hexi District, Tianjin, China, 300222.

References

External links
 
 International Schools Consortium

1986 establishments in China
American international schools in China
Educational institutions established in 1986
High schools in Tianjin
International schools in Tianjin
Private schools in China